Washer pitching is a game, similar to horseshoes, that involves teams of players that take turns tossing washers towards a box or hole. The game has many variations, and may be called washer pitching, washer toss, washers, huachas or washoes (which is based on the similarity to horseshoes). 

However, if a string is not attached to the box, one may take 10 paces from box-to-box, this will usually denote 20 feet.

The throwing player stands on, next to, or behind one box and tosses washers toward the other, normally using an underhand throw.  Scoring is similar to horseshoes in that the second team to throw can wash-out/rebut any points that the first team may have scored, then add to their own total. Three points are awarded to a non-rebutted ringer (a washer in the cup). One point is awarded to each non-rebutted washer inside the box.  Games are normally played to 21 points.

There are variations of rules and scoring for example see the finalized rules in Arizona, USA. www.azwl.org.

See also
Bunnock, also known as Glockenspiel
Toad in the hole (game), a similar British pub game
Penny in the hole
Kubb
Lawn game
Mölkky
Quoits
Tailgate party
Muckers

References

Throwing games
Lawn games
Precision sports